Albig is an Ortsgemeinde – a municipality belonging to a Verbandsgemeinde, a kind of collective municipality – in Rhenish Hesse in the Alzey-Worms district in Rhineland-Palatinate, Germany.

Geography

Location 
The municipality lies in Rhenish Hesse and belongs to the Verbandsgemeinde of Alzey-Land, whose seat is in Alzey.

History 
Traces of New Stone Age (Spiral Ceramic) and Iron Age settlers, believed to be Celts, have been found in Albig. Some finds, such as fibulae, rings and vessels from a La Tène-era grave, are displayed in the Landesmuseum Mainz. On a hill near Albig, the foundations of a Roman villa rustica were unearthed, and because it was mistakenly believed that they were a mediaeval castle ruin, they were named Schloss Hammerstein, “Schloss” being a German word for castle.

Albig had its first documentary mention in 767 in a document donating a vineyard to Lorsch Abbey.

Since 1975 there has been a partnership with the French municipality of Signy-l'Abbaye in the department of Ardennes.

Politics

Mayor 
Albig's current mayor is Wilfried Best.

Coat of arms 
The municipality's arms might be described thus: Per fess, sable a demi-lion rampant Or armed, langued and crowned gules, and argent the letter A of the third.

Economy and infrastructure 
Winegrowing is an important part of local economic life.

Transport 
Within municipal limits lies the Autobahnkreuz Alzey, an Autobahn interchange. The nearest access to the two Autobahnen in question, though, is a good two to three kilometres away. These are Biebelnheim for the A 63 and Bornheim for the A 61.

In the municipality is a stop for Alzey–Mainz and Bingen–Alzey–Worms (Rheinhessenbahn) Regionalbahn trains.

Culture and sightseeing

Regular events 
Albig holds a Wine and Sunflower Festival on the second-last weekend in July. There is also a kermis (church consecration festival, locally known as the Kerb) on the second Sunday in September.

References

Rhenish Hesse
Alzey-Worms